Upper Little York Lake is a lake located by Little York, New York. Fish species present in the lake include bluegill, brown trout, rainbow trout, and pumpkinseed sunfish. There is access via boat launch in Dwyer Memorial Park on the north shore off Little York Road.

References

Lakes of New York (state)
Lakes of Cortland County, New York